John Millar & Sons is a Scottish confectionery company specialising in Mints and Boiled Sweets.

History

The company began in 1844, when John Millar started bakery in Leith, shortly afterwards, the business began selling sweets manufactured in the back room. Millars has become widely known for many sweets including Pan Drops, Chocolate Eclairs, and boiled confectionery such as Blackcurrant & Liquorice.

References

External links 
 https://web.archive.org/web/20090223111608/http://www.millar-mccowan.com/

Scottish confectionery
Food and drink companies of Scotland
Food and drink companies established in 1884
1884 establishments in Scotland
Food and drink companies disestablished in 2006
2006 disestablishments in Scotland
British companies disestablished in 2006
British companies established in 1884